Skeneoides formosissima is a species of minute sea snail, a marine gastropod mollusk in the family Skeneidae.

Circulus jeffreysii Monterosato 1872 is the original description by Monterosato, but it is a nomen nudum, although used as valid by Anders Warén, 1992  as a valid taxon.

Description
The size of the shell attains 1 mm.

Distribution
This species occurs in the Mediterranean Sea off Sicily and Croatia.

References

 Gofas, S.; Le Renard, J.; Bouchet, P. (2001). Mollusca, in: Costello, M.J. et al. (Ed.) (2001). European register of marine species: a check-list of the marine species in Europe and a bibliography of guides to their identification. Collection Patrimoines Naturels, 50: pp. 180–213

External links
 Brugnone G. A. (1873). Miscellanea malachologica. Pars prima. Palermo, Michele Amenta, 15 pp. + 1 pl
 Monterosato, T. A. di. (1872). Notizie intorno alle conchiglie mediterranee. Michele Amenta, Palermo, 61 pp.
 Nofroni, I. & Renda, W. (2021). Reestablishment of the name Skeneoides formosissima (Brugnone, 1973 [sic) instead of S. jeffreysii (Monterosato, 1872) nomen nudum (Gastropoda Vetigastropoda Skeneidae). Biodiversity Journal. 12(4): 841–846]

formosissima
Gastropods described in 1873